Soccer is a common shortened name of association football.

Soccer may also refer to:

 Soccer (1982 video game), a game for the Atari 8-bit family
 Soccer (1985 video game), a game for the Family Computer and Nintendo Entertainment System
 Soccer (1991 video game), a game for the Game Boy
 Soccer (dog), a Jack Russell terrier dog actor

See also
 Soca (disambiguation)